Saw E Kan-Kaung (1313/14–1330) was king of Martaban for 49 days in 1330. E was the last Martaban king to pledge allegiance to Sukhothai.

The eldest son of King Saw O (r. 1311–1323) was placed on the throne by Queen Sanda Min Hla, who made herself his chief queen. Although he had fought against Martaban's former overlord Sukhothai, after his accession, E quickly mended fences with his maternal grandfather King Loe Thai of Sukhothai. But Queen Sanda Min Hla was dissatisfied with the young king, and poisoned him seven weeks later. His assassination provoked an invasion by Sukhothai, which Sanda Min Hla and her new king Binnya E Law (r. 1330–1348) decisively defeated.

Early life
Saw E Kan-Kaung was the elder child of Queen May Hnin Htapi and King Saw O of Martaban in 1313/14. His mother was a princess of Sukhothai. Their parents were wedded in 1311 in a marriage of state between Sukhothai and Martaban. He had one full younger sibling Princess May Hnin Aw-Kanya.

In his childhood years, the prince was the heir presumptive of then ascendant Mon-speaking kingdom. His father broke with his nominal overlord Sukhothai in 1317/18, and went on to seize Sukhothai's possessions in Lamphun and the Tenasserim coast by 1321. However, his father died at the height of success in September 1323. Since E was only about 10 years old, his 19-year-old paternal uncle Saw Zein ascended the throne.

Tavoy campaign and imprisonment
According to the Razadarit Ayedawbon chronicle, E's relationship with his uncle nosedived after an unsuccessful campaign to retake Tavoy (Dawei)  1329–1330. Zein had faced several rebellions since his accession, and lost all of O's conquests back to Siam. Circa 1329, Zein appointed his nephew, then 15 or 16 years old, to lead the campaign to retake Tavoy on the Tenasserim coast. E was able to take Tavoy initially but could not hold on, and had to retreat. The king was furious, and sent E to prison near the frontier with Prome (Pyay).

E's prison stay was short. After the failed Tavoy campaign, Zein lost support among his vassals, and some of his officers. Circa April 1330, Zein was assassinated on the order of one of the king's most trusted officers Zein Pun. But the usurper himself was killed just a week later in a putsch organized by the fallen king's chief queen Sanda Min Hla. She freed E from prison, and come to Martaban to take over the throne.

Reign
At Martaban, E was crowned king, with Sanda Min Hla as his chief queen. E was ambivalent about the queen as he was her first cousin, once removed. (His father Saw O and Sanda Min Hla were first cousins.) The 16-year-old king did not feel comfortable with Min Hla, whom he regarded as his aunt, as his spouse, and spent much time with concubines. Early in his reign, he or his court appeared to have repaired the relationship with Sukhothai. The Razadarit Ayedawbon chronicle describes the relationship as an alliance but may have been a renewal of "subordination" to Sukhothai.

Queen Sanda did not like the turn of events. She killed the young king by serving him a poisoned dish of meat (beef) stew. He ruled for just 49 days.

Aftermath
The powerful queen then placed her half-brother Gov. Binnya E Law of Pegu (Bago) on the throne. She again made herself E Law's chief queen. The new regime then faced the wrath of the king of Sukhothai who was angered by her murder of Saw E. Sukhothai forces invaded in 1330–1331 but were decisively defeated.

Notes

References

Bibliography
 
 
 
 

Hanthawaddy dynasty
1330 deaths
1313 births
14th-century Burmese monarchs